Constantin A. Crețulescu or Kretzulescu (22 May 1809 in Bucharest – 21 March 1884 in Bucharest) was a Romanian academic, politician, and honorary member of the Romanian Academy from 1871. He served as Prime Minister of Romania and Minister of Justice from 1 March 1867 until 4 August 1867.

He was the brother of Nicolae Crețulescu.

References

1809 births
1884 deaths
Prime Ministers of Romania
Prime Ministers of the Principality of Wallachia
Romanian Ministers of Justice
Honorary members of the Romanian Academy